Bačina planina is a mountain in the municipality of Prozor-Rama, Bosnia and Herzegovina.

See also
List of mountains in Bosnia and Herzegovina

References

Mountains of Bosnia and Herzegovina